Cluster University of Srinagar (C-U, CUS) is a collegiate state university located in Srinagar, Jammu and Kashmir, India. It is a cluster of five colleges of the Srinagar city. It has been established under The Srinagar and Jammu Cluster Universities Act, 2016 together with Cluster University of Jammu and is an initiative of the centrally sponsored scheme, Rashtriya Uchchatar Shiksha Abhiyan (RUSA), to create new universities through upgradation of existing colleges and conversion of colleges in a cluster.

Constituent colleges
The five constituent colleges of the university are Amar Singh College, Sri Pratap College, Government College for Women, M.A. Road, Srinagar, Government Degree College, Bemina and the Institute of Advanced Studies in Education, Srinagar.

Courses Offered 

Source:

Academics
The university offers undergraduate, postgraduate, integrated master's and research degrees in humanities, social sciences, natural sciences, applied sciences (engineering), management, commerce and professional courses.

Campus
The infrastructure development is funded through the Rashtriya Uchchatar Shiksha Abhiyan (RUSA).

See also 

 University of Kashmir
 Central University of Kashmir
 S.P College, Srinagar
 Amar Singh College, Srinagar
 Law Society, Central University of Kashmir
 GDC Bemina

References

External links
 
 

Universities in Jammu and Kashmir
Cluster University of Srinagar
Educational institutions established in 2016
2016 establishments in Jammu and Kashmir